The Stone Store at Kerikeri in the Bay of Islands is New Zealand’s oldest surviving stone building.

Part of the second Church Missionary Society station in New Zealand, the store was designed by John Hobbs to replace an earlier wooden storehouse. The Stone Store was erected between 1832 and 1836 by a mason, William Parrott, a carpenter, Ben Nesbitt, and a team of Māori. Construction was of sandstone from Australia, local volcanic rocks, and burnt shell mortar. Iron ties and window bars were forged by James Kemp, though these corroded the sandstone. Initially the building had a wooden belfry on one side.

The Stone Store was intended to be the base of the Church Missionary Society’s trading post, selling produce from the farms at the te Waimate mission to ships, and European goods to Māori. Marsden planned to build a flour mill on the adjacent Kerikeri River, but this was eventually built at te Waimate instead. Stone was used to protect wheat from rats, for defence against Māori and to reduce the risk of fire.  

By the mid-1830s, the mission stations could not compete with the private enterprise of other European settlers, either as traders or farmers, and the store was not profitable.

The building was converted into the mission library by Bishop Selwyn in the early 1840s. Following the sacking of Kororareka in the Flagstaff War, it was briefly taken over by Governor George Grey for use as a magazine and barracks. After the cessation of hostilities in 1845, the stone store was leased to become the centre of Kauri gum trading operation, and then in 1863 it was used to house a boys' school. The building was sold to the Kemp family in 1874, and was used as a general store, although it increasingly became a tourist attraction. The Stone Store was purchased from the Kemps by the New Zealand Historic Places Trust (now Heritage New Zealand) in 1975. Conservation work was done in the 1990s. The store, together with the neighbouring Mission House now form a small museum.

References

External links
 
 Stone Store history on NZHistory

Heritage New Zealand Category 1 historic places in the Northland Region
Far North District
Museums in the Northland Region
History museums in New Zealand
History of the Bay of Islands
1830s architecture in New Zealand